Frank Putnam Flint (July 15, 1862February 11, 1929) was a United States Senator from California from  1905 to 1911.

Born in North Reading, Massachusetts, in 1869 his family moved to San Francisco, California, where he attended public schools. He had asthma. In 1888 he moved to Orange, then Los Angeles, California. On February 25, 1890, he married  Katherine J. Bloss in Los Angeles; and they had 2 children, a girl about 1892, and boy about 1894. Also in 1890, he was appointed a clerk in the United States marshal's office in Los Angeles, and began to study law. In 1892 he was appointed assistant United States attorney under Mathew Thompson Allen. In 1883 he resigned and formed a law partnership with Allen, Allen & Flint, which lasted 2 years until Allen became a Judge. In 1895, Flint and Donald Barker reformed the law firm as Flint & Barker. In 1897 Flint was appointed United States attorney for the southern district of California, and served 4 years. Flint was active in Republican politics. He was a fruit-grower, politician and banker.

In Los Angeles he was a member of the chamber of commerce and of its law committee; a member of the Municipal League, the Sunset club, the California club, the Union League club, the Republican league, the Masonic order and Knights Templar. He attended the Presbyterian church, was a trustee of Occidental college, a director of 2 banks (Equitable Savings, Los Angeles National).

He served as United States Attorney for the Southern District of California from 1897 to 1901 and as a U.S. Senator from California from 1905 until 1911 as a Republican, and holds the distinction of being the 1000th senator in overall seniority. Flint served one term in the Senate and did not seek reelection.

The city of La Cañada Flintridge, California is named, in part, for him, as he was a developer of Flintridge, which merged with La Cañada in the late 20th century. As a Senator from California, he played a great part in making the Mission style the official architectural style of government buildings in Southern California  and played a major political role in bringing Owens Valley water to metropolitan Los Angeles.

On his death in 1929, Flint was interred in the Forest Lawn Memorial Park Cemetery in Glendale.

See also 
 
 Frank Putnam Flint Fountain

References

External links

 

1862 births
1929 deaths
Burials at Forest Lawn Memorial Park (Glendale)
California Republicans
Republican Party United States senators from California
United States Attorneys for the Southern District of California